Hains Point is located at the southern tip of East Potomac Park between the main branch of the Potomac River and the Washington Channel in southwest Washington, D.C.  The land on which the park is located is sometimes described as a peninsula but is actually an island: the Washington Channel connects with the Tidal Basin north of the park and the Jefferson Memorial.  The island is artificial:  it was built up from Potomac dredging material from 1880 to 1892.

History 
In 1920, Girl Scouts obtained permission to operate a "tea house" at the Hains Point Park in Washington D.C.  Traveling by car was still a new adventure and the teahouse was a pleasant destination, offering refreshments and restrooms for tourists.

Hains Point is named in memory of Peter Conover Hains, Major General, United States Army, who is buried in Arlington National Cemetery.  He designed the Tidal Basin in Washington, D.C., thus solving the drainage problems and foul smell of most of the Washington area marshlands.  Hains was born in 1840 and died in 1921.  He attended the United States Military Academy at West Point.
 
Hains Point was formerly known as the location of a sculpture called The Awakening, which was installed at the Point in 1980.  However, the sculpture was moved to the National Harbor, Maryland development on February 19, 2008.

Geography 
The confluence of the Potomac and Anacostia rivers is at Hains Point.  The point faces Fort Lesley McNair and the National War College, both of which are on the eastern shore of the Washington Channel, and Bolling Air Force Base, across the Anacostia River.  Further northwest on the island is the Thomas Jefferson Memorial.  All of these points of interest lie within the District of Columbia.  To the southwest, across the Potomac in Virginia, is Ronald Reagan Washington National Airport.

Hains Point and East Potomac Park are within the jurisdiction of the National Mall and Memorial Parks unit of the National Park Service.  The  park contains the East Potomac Golf Club and East Potomac Swimming Pool, along with a number of Washington's famous cherry trees; these trees extend well into Hains Point.

The perimeter of Hains Point and the rest of East Potomac Park is lined with a concrete walking/bike path.  However, the Potomac and Anacostia Rivers often overflow their banks during high tide, covering the path with water.

A straight and generally flat stretch of road extends in a loop along the perimeter of East Potomac Park, including Hains Point.  This road, Ohio Drive, is one way within the park; traffic must travel clockwise, going generally northwest on the Potomac River side of the peninsula, and generally southeast on the Washington Channel side.  Various cultivars of cherry trees line both sides of the road.  Another road, Buckeye Drive, bisects the peninsula and connects the north and south portions of Ohio Drive within the park.  Ohio Drive extends beyond the park and follows the Potomac as far as the Lincoln Memorial.

As of June 2010, East Potomac Park contains 320 parking spaces, which are accessible from both Ohio Drive and Buckeye Drive.  Traffic is prohibited on weekends and some holidays on the sections of Ohio Drive between Buckeye Drive and Hains Point.  This stretch of road, estimated by some as 3.2 miles (5.2 km) long (including Buckeye Drive), is a favorite of the local bicycling and inline skating community.  The point and the park are also popular with other residents of the DC metropolitan area, particularly during the summer. 
 
Therefore, it is comparatively easy for persons with mobility impairments to navigate.

See also 
 East Potomac Park
 West Potomac Park

Notes

External links

 Arlington National Cemetery Article on Hains
 The East Potomac Park Aquatic Center
 East Potomac Golf Course
 Washington Post Going-Out Guide page on Hains Point
 About.com page on East Potomac Park and Hains Point 
 Hains Point: How Did It Get Its Name?

Geography of Washington, D.C.
Hains Point
National Mall and Memorial Parks
Southwest (Washington, D.C.)